Sagine Sémajuste is a Haitian Canadian actress and dancer. She is best known for her recurring roles as Farah in the television series 19-2, and Sabine in the television series Grand Army.

She has also appeared in the films Mahalia Melts in the Rain, Akilla's Escape and Faith Heist, and the television series St. Nickel, Pretty Hard Cases and The Lake.

Early life
Sémajuste was born and raised in Ottawa, Ontario. She was introduced to hip-hop dancing through Culture Shock Ottawa. She moved to New York to pursue musical theatre, graduating from the American Musical and Dramatic Academy (AMDA) before moving back to Canada, where she is now based in Toronto.

Filmography

Film

Television

References

External links

21st-century Canadian actresses
Canadian film actresses
Canadian television actresses
Canadian people of Haitian descent
Black Canadian actresses
Actresses from Ottawa
Living people
Year of birth missing (living people)